The 2001 Conference USA men's soccer tournament was the seventh edition of the Conference USA Men's Soccer Tournament. The tournament decided the Conference USA champion and guaranteed representative into the 2001 NCAA Division I Men's Soccer Championship. The tournament was hosted by the University of South Florida and the games were played at the USF Soccer Stadium.

Bracket

Awards
Most Valuable Midfielder:
Brad Davis, Saint Louis
Most Valuable Forward:
Dipsy Selolwane, Saint Louis
Most Valuable Defender:
Marty Tappel, Saint Louis
Most Valuable Goalkeeper:
John Politis, Saint Louis

References

External links
 

Conference USA Men's Soccer Tournament
Tournament
Conference USA Men's Soccer Tournament
Conference USA Men's Soccer Tournament